Fritz Spiess (2 February 1925 – 12 March 1998 in Germany) was a Canadian cinematographer.

Biography
Spiess studied photography in Germany and immigrated to Canada in 1951. Spiess initially worked as a still photographer until 1954 and then focused on cinematography from 1954 until his retirement in 1990. He also directed television commercials. He was a founding member of the Canadian Society of Cinematographers. Because of the many awards his commercials won and the awards that were created in his name, he became known as the "dean of Canadian cinematographers".  Significant portions of his commercial cinematography legacy have been permanently archived at the University of Toronto.

Photography
Spiess' still photography featured works taken during post-war Germany and early 1950s Canada.  His Canadian photos from the 1950s appeared in major publications such as Life and Mayfair. Many of these photographs are now featured at Toronto's Bulger Gallery. Eight photographs from his "Paris in Munich" 1948 photoshoot form part of the permanent collection of the Art Gallery of Ontario and were on display at the AGO in February 2012.

Cinematography

First Film: St. Thomas Choirboy
Spiess' first film was shot in 1941 when he was 16 years of age. The film was "A day in the life of a St. Thomas choirboy".  Spiess was a student of the St. Thomas school in Leipzig while he was growing up. The film was initially silent, but after his death sound was added by friends and colleagues to honour his memory. The film premiered at Spiess' memorial service, held on April 19, 1998. In March 2012 portions of Spiess's 1941 film were used in an MDR documentary about the St. Thomas School on the Choir's 800th anniversary.

Television Commercials
In 1954 in Toronto, Spiess began working on TV commercials. Commercials became his primary focus and his skill and craft developed steadily.  He became widely known for his innovative lighting effects and special effects, especially molten gold.  Later in his career, he added directing to his skill set along with the director of photography. In total, he shot over 3,000 TV commercials for many major Canadian and international brands.

Fables of La Fontaine
In 1958, Spiess was the cinematographer of the Fables of La Fontaine, a TV series that appeared on CBC.

Disney Expo 67: 360 Film
Hired by Walt Disney, Spiess flew across Canada shooting scenes for the 360-degree film that was the highlight of the Telephone pavilion at Expo 67.

Awards
1973	Canadian Society of Cinematographers (CSC) Bill Hilson Award (Initial Recipient) - Outstanding service contributing to the development of the motion picture industry	
1974	CSC Annual Award for Best Cinematography in a TV Commercial
1979	TVB Bessies Fritz Spiess Award (Initial Recipient) Each year, the Spiess Award is given to a person who has displayed "continuing, consistent dedication to excellence in the art of the television commercial". It can be presented to a cameraman, director, producer, editor, composer, art director, copywriter or an advertiser, who has "fulfilled the set-out criteria of overall excellence".
1979	CSC Annual Award for Best Cinematography in a TV Commercial
1987	Kodak New Century Award (Initial Recipient) - Persons who have made an outstanding contribution to the art of cinematography
1983	Fuji Award - Extraordinary contributions to the CSC
Various dates - Gold, Silver and Bronze Lions in Cannes and Venice
1999 The CSC Fritz Spiess Award for Commercial Cinematography - The CSC unveiled this new award in honour of Fritz's legacy at their 1999 Awards Gala

Archives
After his death, hundreds of his commercials and other materials were sorted and archived.  Released to the public on December 12, 1999, the archives were initially and generously hosted by William F. White, a major Toronto film rental firm that Spiess had worked with for many years. The donated material is now a significant asset of the Media Commons archive at the University of Toronto.

References

External links
 

The Fritz Spiess Archive Website

Fritz Spiess artist profile at the Bulger Gallery
University of Toronto Media Commons Fritz Spiess Archive
Playback magazine remembers Fritz Spiess - Dean of Cinematographers
Playback on the launch of the Fritz Spiess Archives

UofT Student presentation on the Archive

Canadian cinematographers
1925 births
1998 deaths
German emigrants to Canada